Matteo Pelatti (born 17 March 1978) is a former Italian professional footballer who played as a forward for Formigine of the Italian Serie D, the top level of the amateur league.

Career
Pelatti played the last 2 games of 1996–97 Serie A season for A.C. Milan. Since age 19 he left for 2 difference Serie C1 club, Como and Brescello in temporary deal. He also spent 5 months for Sassuolo in the second half of 1999–2000 Serie C2. In June 2000 he left for Prato in co-ownership deal for a peppercorn fee, re-joining former teammate Simone Bonomi. Both players returned to Milan in June 2001 with Mirco Gasparetto moved to Prato for peppercorn fee as compensation. However, both players were re-sold back to Serie C1. Pelatti joined Monza in new co-ownership deal for 400 million lire (€206,583), as a compensation for the return of Marko Topić. The club gave another 50% registration rights to Monza in June 2002 for free. Since 2003 he started his journeyman career, which changed his employer once a year until 2009. He left Spezia in temporary deal in 2006 after the club won promotion to Serie B as one of the champion of 2005–06 Serie C1. In 2007, he joined Reggiana along with Giuseppe Alessi, Vito Grieco and Paolo Ponzo. He settled in 2009 for Formigine in Eccellenza Emilia–Romagna, the top level of Emilia–Romagna regional football. He won promotion for the club in 2012 to Serie D, the interregional league and top level of non-professional football. he remained in the squad as one of the forward for 2012–13 Serie D season.

Honours
Spezia
 Supercoppa di Serie C1: 2006
 Serie C1: 2006

Reggiana
 Supercoppa di Serie C2: 2008
 Serie C2: 2008

Formigine
 Eccellenza Emilia–Romagna: 2012

References

External links
 
 Football.it profile 
 Serie A profile 

Italian footballers
A.C. Milan players
Como 1907 players
U.S. Sassuolo Calcio players
A.C. Prato players
A.C. Monza players
A.S.D. Victor San Marino players
Giulianova Calcio players
S.S.D. Sanremese Calcio players
Spezia Calcio players
A.C. Reggiana 1919 players
U.S. Alessandria Calcio 1912 players
Serie A players
Serie B players
Association football forwards
Sportspeople from the Province of Reggio Emilia
1978 births
Living people
Footballers from Emilia-Romagna